Largie Castle is a former mansion house at Tayinloan, Kintyre, Argyll and Bute, Scotland. The house was designed by architect Charles Wilson for The Hon. Augustus Moreton Macdonald and was built in 1857–9. The house was pulled down in 1958.

References

Castles in Argyll and Bute
Houses in Argyll and Bute
Former country houses in Scotland
Demolished buildings and structures in Scotland
Scottish country houses destroyed in the 20th century
1859 establishments in Scotland
Buildings and structures demolished in 1958
Kintyre